This is the discography of hip hop artist Kool Savas, from Germany with Turkish descent.

Studio albums

Mixtapes

Collaboration albums

Extended plays and LPs

Singles
Solo

Collaborative singles as Xavas
(Xavas being Xavier Naidoo and Kool Savas)

Featured singles

Sources
 https://www.webcitation.org/5hXQ4z6Xj?url=http://austriancharts.at/
 https://web.archive.org/web/20091212080952/http://swisscharts.com/

References

Hip hop discographies
Savas, Kool